Graptophyllum repandum is a species of plant in the family Acanthaceae. It is endemic to Fiji.

See also
 IUCN Red List

References

Sources
 World Conservation Monitoring Centre 1998

Endemic flora of Fiji
Graptophyllum
Near threatened plants
Taxonomy articles created by Polbot